William Hyland (born 1989) is an Irish hurler who currently plays as a left wing-forward for the Laois senior team.

Hyland made his first appearance for the team during the 2006 championship and immediately became a regular member of the starting fifteen. Since then he has won a National League (Division 2) medal.

At club level Hyland is a two-time county club championship medalist with the Clough–Ballacolla club.

References

 

1989 births
Living people
Clough-Ballacolla hurlers
Laois inter-county hurlers
Leinster inter-provincial hurlers